This is a list of awards and nominations received by Michalis Hatzigiannis.

Arion Music Awards
Hatzigiannis received 20 awards from 16 nominations.

Cyprus Music Awards

MAD Video Music Awards
Hatzigiannis received 11 awards from 33 nominations.

Man of the Year Awards

MTV Europe Music Awards

Pop Corn Music Awards

Prosopa Awards

Status Man of the Year Awards

Super Music Awards 2021

World Music Awards

References

Hatzigiannis, Michalis